Eric Scott Sievers (born November 9, 1957 in Urbana, Illinois) is an American former professional football player who was a tight end in the National Football League (NFL). A 6'4", 235-lb. tight end from the University of Maryland, Sievers was selected by the San Diego Chargers in the fourth round of the 1981 NFL Draft. He was named to the NFL All Rookie team in 1981. He played for ten NFL seasons from 1981-1990 for the Chargers, the Los Angeles Rams and the New England Patriots.

He attended Washington-Lee High School in Arlington, Virginia where he earned 1975 Parade All-American and Scholastic All-American honors.  Other All-Americans included future NFL players, Mark Malone, Matt Suhey, Stan Brock, Brad Budde, Anthony Munoz, Bruce Clark, and Curtis Dickey. He was inducted into the Virginia High School Hall of Fame in 1997.

1957 births
Living people
People from Urbana, Illinois
American football tight ends
Maryland Terrapins football players
San Diego Chargers players
Los Angeles Rams players
New England Patriots players
Washington-Liberty High School alumni
Ed Block Courage Award recipients